Manturovsky District is the name of several administrative and municipal districts in Russia:
Manturovsky District, Kostroma Oblast,  an administrative and municipal district of Kostroma Oblast
Manturovsky District, Kursk Oblast, an administrative and municipal district of Kursk Oblast

References